Siddapura  is a town and the headquarters of Siddapur taluk, It is located at a distance of  from Sirsi through SH 93. it is part Uttara Kannada district in Karnataka. It is nestled among the Malenadu region. The town is surrounded by forests and lush greenery, and the region is popular for its many waterfalls.it is known for its proximity to Jog Falls, Adike (Areca nut) is the primary crop grown in the villages that surround the town.

Demographics

, Siddapur had a population of 14,049. Males were 51% of the population and females 49%. The average literacy rate is 82% (male 88%, female 82%). 11% of the population is under 6 years of age. Kannada is the most common language.

Siddapur's primary ethnic and religious groups are Daivajna Brahmins, Vokkaligas, Lingayats, Namadhari Naiks, Gudigars, Gaud Saraswat Brahmins, Halakki Vokkaligas, Havyaks, Kurubas, Madivals, Christians, Muslims, and Marathas.

Transport

Bus service is provided by KSRTC and a few private bus operators. These buses connect Siddapur to elsewhere in Karnataka, as well as a few buses to other states. Siddapur is well connected by road to the surrounding area.

The nearest railway station is along the South Western Railway in Talaguppa (18 km/11 mi away).

Economy
The main occupation of the residents of Siddapur is agriculture, primarily areca nut cultivation. In addition to areca nut, commodities like rice, coffee, pineapple, cardamom, coconut, pepper and vanilla are also grown. Other industries include soda making, ice cream making, pineapple juice factories, jackfruit chip mills and banana chip mills.

Banks with full facilities include SBI, Bank of Baroda and Canara Bank. Co-operative banks include Suvarna Co-operative Bank and Bhavana Co-operative Bank. Manappuram Finance Ltd. is also present.

Culture

Yakshagana is a classical form of dance drama popular throughout the coastal districts of Karnataka.

Religion
Siddapur is home to many Hindu temples. The Hindu festival Marikamba is celebrated every five years. This festival commemorates the goddess Marikamba, a form of Durga. Over 100,000 people attend this festival, making it one of the largest in the region. Other festivals include Basaveshwar Jaatre held annually in February and Shanishwar held annually in March. Siddapur has the one and only temple to Karnataka Naada Devi Bhuvaneshwari at Bhuvangiri on the Kumta Road. Every year, during Kannada Rajyotsava, JayaKarnataka, a pro-Kannada organization, visits the temple and celebrates Kannada Rajyotsava.

Two Sunni mosques are located in Siddapur, Badriya Jamia Masjid and Bedkani Jamia Masjid, and a church, the Holy Rosary Catholic Church, is located in the Ravindranagar neighborhood.

Cuisine

 Jackfruit chips,
 banana chips,
 sugarcane juice,
 Kadubu, a steamed dessert made of jackfruit pulp and jaggery, served with hot ghee (clarified butter),
 Holge, a sweet tortilla, made with gramflour and jaggery, or with coconut,
 Todadevu, a special kind of thin crust dosa made of sugarcane juice or fresh honey,
 Koli Kajjaya, made of rice flour fried in oil, using roti and served with thick potato sambar or country chicken curry (soup),
 Hosagere Kajjaya, made of rice flour fried in oil, using roti and served with thick potato sambar or country chicken curry (soup),
 Kotte Kadabu, made of fermented rice paste steam boiled in banana leaf packets for about four hours, it tastes great with chicken curry (soup), mutton curry (soup), coconut chutney, fish curry (soup), prawn (shrimp) curry (soup) and sambar (vegetable stew),
 Appe Huli, a kind of raw mango curry (soup).

Communication
The nearest LPT-49 TV relay station airing Doordarshan National Channel is in Sagara, 38 km away. Cable TV and direct-to-home services are widely used and have replaced the conventional VHF/UHF TV antennas and satellite dish antennas. Local cable is also available with shikhara TV, which provides essential day to day information to the people of Siddapur.

Sagar AIR is the nearest radio station and can be heard on 100.1 MHz. There is little amateur radio in town.

All major mobile operators are available in Siddapur, as are most broadband facilities.

Hospitals
There are several hospitals in Siddapur, including:
 Taluk Govt Hospital, Siddapur,
 Omkar Nursing Home (Dr. S. R. Hegde), Ravindra Nagar,
 Shreyas Hospital, APMC,
 Dhanvantari Ayurvedic Medical College,Hospital Avaraguppa and
 Govt. Hospital, Kolsirsi.

References

Villages in Uttara Kannada district